Regard: Music by Film is a compilation of film scores by composer Paul Schütze, released in 1991 through Extreme Records.

Track listing

Personnel 
Paul Schütze – instruments, production
Frank Lipson – mastering

References

External links 
 

1991 compilation albums
Extreme Records compilation albums
Paul Schütze albums
Albums produced by Paul Schütze